Gyula (or ) is a town in Békés County, Hungary. The town is best known for its Medieval castle and a thermal bath. Ferenc Erkel, the composer of the Hungarian national anthem, and Albrecht Dürer the Elder, the father of Albrecht Dürer, were also born in Gyula.

Geography
The Békéscsaba-Gyula-Kötegyán railway line and Highway 44 also cross the town. Highway 44 is a four-lane expressway between Gyula and the county seat Békéscsaba.

Name
Gyula is named after the medieval Hungarian warlord Gyula III. Gyula was also a title among the Hungarian tribes and still a popular given name for boys.

In Turkish, the town is also known as Göle.

History
The first recorded reference to Gyula was in a document dated 1313 which mentions a monastery called Gyulamonostora (Julamonustra in Latin). By 1332 the settlement around the monastery was called Gyula. The construction of Gyula Castle began in the 14th century but finished only in the mid-16th century. It was the property of the Maróthy family and later John Corvinus, the illegitimate son of Matthias Corvinus. Turks conquered Gyula in 1566 and the town remained part of the Ottoman Empire until liberated by Christian troops in 1694. Due to the wars, most of the native Hungarian population fled from Gyula and Békés County became near uninhabited. The landowner János Harruckern invited German, Hungarian, and Romanian settlers, who re-established the town in the early 18th century. In 1881, the town had 18,046 inhabitants, of which 12,103 were Hungarians, 2,608 Romanians, 2,124 Germans, 400 Slovaks and 811 of other ethnicities. Gyula became a popular tourist destination in the 20th century. The thermal bath was established in 1942 and expanded in 1959, and the castle was restored in 1962.

Demographics 
According to the 2011 census the total population of Gyula was 31,067, of whom there were 25,895 (83.4%) Hungarians, 974 (3.1%) Romanians, 971 (3.1%) Germans and 102 (0.3%) Romani by ethnicity. In Hungary, people can declare more than one ethnicity, so some people declared Hungarian and a minority one together. Gyula is the center of the small native Romanian community in Hungary. It has its own newspaper published in Gyula, Foaia Românească ("The Romanian Sheet").

In 2011 there were 5,726 (18.4%) Roman Catholic, 5,560 (17.9%) Hungarian Reformed (Calvinist), 606 (2.0%) Orthodox and 507 (1.6%) Lutheran in Gyula. 8,304 people (26.7%) were irreligious and 453 (1.5%) Atheist, while 9,012 people (29.0%) did not declare their religion.

Tourist attractions 
Gyula Castle (Gyulai vár)
Thermal bath (Gyulai gyógyfürdő)
100-year-old confectionery (100 éves cukrászda)
Town hall, 1861 (Városháza)
Birth house of Ferenc Erkel (Erkel Ferenc szülőháza)
Saint Michael Cathedral, 1825 (Szent Miklós katedrális)
Roman Catholic church, 1775-1777 (Római katolikus templom)
Roman Catholic chapel, 1738–1752, (Római katolikus kápolna)

Politics
The current mayor of Gyula is Dr. Ernő István Görgényi of the Fidesz-KDNP party.

The local Municipal Assembly has 14+1 members divided into this political parties and alliances:

Notable people

Born in Gyula
 Béla Bánáthy (1919–2003), social scientist and professor
 Zoltán Bay (1900–1992), physicist (born in Gyulavári, now part of Gyula) 
 Imre Bródy (1891–1944), physicist 
 Albrecht Dürer the Elder (1427–1502), the father of Albrecht Dürer
 Ferenc Erkel (1810–1893), composer
 Imre König (1901–1992), chess player
 László Krasznahorkai (born 1954), novelist and screenwriter
 Mihály Mező (born 1978), singer and musician  
 George Pomutz (1818–1882), Romanian-American diplomat and general

Lived in Gyula
 (1974–2013), Hungarian bodybuilding champion
Béla Bartók (1881–1945), Hungarian composer

Burials in Gyula
John Corvin (1473–1504), King of Bosnia, illegitimate son of Matthias Corvinus
Beatrice de Frangepan (1480–1510), wife of John Corvin

Twin Towns - Sister Cities 
Gyula is twinned with:

 Arad, Romania (1994)
 Bălți, Moldova
 Budrio, Italy (1965)
 Ditzingen, Germany (1991)
 Droitwich, United Kingdom (2001)
 Krumpendorf, Austria (1995)
 Miercurea-Ciuc, Romania (1993)
 Schenkenfelden, Austria (1997)
 Zalău, Romania (1991)

References

External links 

  in Hungarian

 
Populated places in Békés County
Hungary–Romania border crossings
Thermal baths in Hungary
Romanian communities in Hungary